Atkins High School may refer to:

In the United States 
 Atkins High School (Arkansas), Atkins, Arkansas
 Atkins High School (North Carolina), Winston-Salem, North Carolina
 Simon G. Atkins Academic & Technology High School, Winston-Salem, North Carolina